Alan Cooke may refer to:
 Alan Cooke (table tennis)
 Alan Cooke (politician)

See also
 Alan Cook (disambiguation)
 Allan Cooke, Australian rules football player